Poland is a public art work by artist Mark di Suvero located at the Lynden Sculpture Garden near Milwaukee, Wisconsin. The sculpture is an abstract form; it is installed on the lawn.

Description 
The sculpture is composed of juxtaposed steel elements including I-beams and a mast. The materials are rusted.

References 

Outdoor sculptures in Milwaukee
1966 sculptures
Steel sculptures in Wisconsin
1966 establishments in Wisconsin
Works by Mark di Suvero